Wind power in Asia is an important component in the Asian energy industry and one of the key sources of renewable energy in the region. As of April 2016, the installed capacity of wind power in Asia (excluding the Middle East) totalled 175,831 MW. Asia is the fastest growing region in terms of wind energy, having increased its installed capacity by 33,858 MW in 2005 (a 24% increase over 2014). China, with 145,362 MW of installed capacity, is the world's largest generator of electricity from wind energy. India is the second largest in Asia with an installed capacity of 25,088 MW. Other key countries include Japan (1,394 MW), Taiwan (188 MW), South Korea (173 MW) and the Philippines (33 MW).

Statistics

Installed wind power capacity

@If data is not available for a particular year for a given country, for calculating the total the last available data is considered.

See also

 Wind farm
 Wind power in India
 Wind power in Iran
 Wind power in Pakistan
 Wind power in Thailand

References

 
 
Renewable energy in Asia